Eddie Butler may refer to:

 Eddie Butler (baseball) (born 1991), baseball pitcher
 Eddie Butler (rugby union) (1957–2022), Welsh rugby union player, journalist, sports commentator
 Eddie Butler (singer) (born 1971), Israeli singer
 Eddie Butler, participant in the Balcombe Street Siege
 Eddy Butler (born 1962), former elections officer of the British National Party

See also
 Edward Butler (disambiguation)
 Ed Butler